Rice is an unincorporated community in Putnam County, in the U.S. state of Ohio.

History
Rice was originally centered on a country post office. A post office was established at Rice in 1876, and remained in operation until 1904.

References

Unincorporated communities in Putnam County, Ohio
Unincorporated communities in Ohio